Bodil Rasmussen (born 12 December 1957 in Fredericia) is a Danish rower.

References 
 
 

1957 births
Living people
Danish female rowers
People from Fredericia
Rowers at the 1984 Summer Olympics
Olympic bronze medalists for Denmark
Olympic rowers of Denmark
Olympic medalists in rowing
Medalists at the 1984 Summer Olympics
Sportspeople from the Region of Southern Denmark